Donga Kollu is a 1988 Telugu-language comedy film, produced by Gutta Madhusudana Rao under the M. R. C. Movie Creations banner and directed by Vijaya Bapineedu. It stars Rajendra Prasad and Sumalatha, with music composed by Vasu Rao. The film is a remake of Malayalam film Sanmanassullavarkku Samadhanam (1986).

Plot
Allipilli Anjaneyulu is a lawyer who is struggling with heavy family debts. To escape from bankruptcy and having to give up their home he decides to sell their property in the city. A middle class family lives there and Neeraja, the sole breadwinner, disagrees as she can't afford to find and pay rent for a new house. To get back his house, Anjaneyulu undertakes everything, such as seeking legal advice from an advocate Lankela Shankara Rao and the help of his relative Inspector Bellam Appa Rao but fails. So, Anjaneyulu schemes a plan to smoke his tenants and enters the house by trapping Neeraja's innocent mother Tulasamma (Subha). There onwards, he makes hilarious attempts to vacate when Neeraja loses her patience and calls her maternal uncle Bombay Dada to exist Anjaneyulu. In the beginning, Anjaneyulu gets frightened by looking at his attire but he makes him run away. Now Neeraja consults the same advocate Shankar Rao and handovers the rental receipts which Anjaneyulu cleverly steals and destroys. On the other hand, Anjaneyulu calls his family and occupies the house when helpless Neeraja becomes low. Anjaneyulu not able to see their suffering then he enquires regarding them when he learns her problems and about her past. Neeraja's father is a hardcore criminal who has murdered his own son for which Neeraja put him behind bars and before leaving he has challenged to eliminate her too. Parallelly, Neeraja loses her job, her father escapes from jail and tries to kill her when Anjaneyulu comes to her rescue. At last, Anjaneyulu vacates the house without any reservations when Neeraja understands his virtue and stops him. Finally, the movie ends on a happy note with the marriage of Anjaneyulu & Neeraja.

Cast

 Rajendra Prasad as Allipilli Anjaneyulu
 Sumalatha as Neeraja
 Satyanarayana as Bombay Dada
 Nutan Prasad as Inspector Bellam Appa Rao
 Brahmanandam as Veeragandham Appa Rao
 Raavi Kondala Rao as Adovocate Lankela Shankara Rao
 Pradeep Shakthi as Nagaraju
 Dr. Siva Prasad as Drill Master
 Kasi Viswanath as Sontikommu Somaraju
 Vankayala Satyanarayana as Boss
 Misro as Manager
 Chitti Babu as Constable 
 Shubha as Tulasamma
 Disco Shanthi as item number
 Pavala Shyamala as Shyamala
 Kalpana Rai as Veeragandham's wife
 Y. Vijaya as Tapoppula Tayaramma

Soundtrack

The soundtrack was composed by Saluri Vasu Rao and released by AVM Audio.

Others
 VCDs and DVDs on - SHALIMAR Video Company, [[Hyderabad, New Delhi
|Hyderabad]]

References

1988 films
Telugu remakes of Malayalam films
1980s Telugu-language films